The 2022–23 Penn State Nittany Lions women's ice hockey season will represent Pennsylvania State University during the 2022–23 NCAA Division I women's ice hockey season.

Offseason

Recruiting

Departures

Standings

Schedule 

|-
!colspan=12 style="  "| Regular Season
|-

|-
!colspan=12 style="background:#0a2351; "| CHA Tournament

|-
!colspan=12 style="background:#0a2351; "| NCAA Tournament

Roster

Awards 

 Tessa Janecke named CHA Rookie of the Week (September 26, 2022).
 Courtney Correia named CHA Forward of the Week (October 3, 2022).
 Lyndie Lobdell named CHA Defensive Player of the Week (October 10, 2022).
 Head Coach Jeff Kampersal earns 400th Win (October 14, 2022).
 Lyndie Lobdell named CHA Defensive Player of the Week (October 17, 2022).
 Josie Bothun named CHA Goalie of the Week (October 17, 2022).
 Alyssa Machado named CHA Forward of the Week (October 24, 2022).
 Tessa Janecke named CHA Rookie of the Week (October 31, 2022).
 Izzy Heminger named CHA Defensive Player of the Week (October 31, 2022).
 Kiara Zanon named CHA Forward of the Month (Month of October).
 Tessa Janecke named CHA Rookie of the Month (Month of October).
 Kendall Butze named CHA Rookie of the Week (November 7, 2022).
 Josie Bothun named CHA Goalie of the Week (November 7, 2022).
 Josie Bothun named CHA Goalie of the Week (November 15, 2022).
 Kiara Zanon named CHA Forward of the Week (November 15, 2022).
 Josie Bothun named CHA Goalie of the Week (November 28, 2022).
 Josie Bothun named CHA Goalie of the Month (Month of November).
 Josie Bothun named CHA Goalie of the Week (December 5, 2022).
 Izzy Heminger named CHA Defensive Player of the Week (December 5, 2022).
 Tessa Janecke named CHA Rookie of the Week (December 5, 2022).
 Kiara Zanon named CHA Forward of the Week (January 1, 2023).
 Josie Bothun named CHA Goalie of the Week (January 1, 2023).
 Izzy Heminger named CHA Defensive Player of the Week (January 1, 2023).
 Tessa Janecke named CHA Rookie of the Week (January 1, 2023).
 Kiara Zanon named CHA Forward of the Month (Month of December).
 Josie Bothun named CHA Goalie of the Month (Month of December).
 Izzy Heminger named CHA Defensive Player of the Month (Month of December).
 Tessa Janecke named CHA Rookie of the Month (Month of December).
 Tessa Janecke named Hockey Commissioner's Association (HCA) National Rookie of the Month (Month of December).
 Josie Bothun named to HCA Goalie of the Year Watch List (January 11, 2023).
 Kiara Zanon named CHA Forward of the Week (January 16, 2023).
 Tessa Janecke named CHA Rookie of the Week (January 24, 2023).
 Eleri MacKay name CHA Forward of the Week (January 30, 2023). 
 Josie Bothun named CHA Goalie of the Month (Month of January).
 Tessa Janecke named CHA Rookie of the Month (Month of January).
 Tessa Janecke named to HCA Rookie of the Year Watch List (February 2, 2023).
 Tessa Janecke named CHA Rookie of the Week (February 6, 2023).
 Kiara Zanon named CHA Forward of the Week (February 6, 2023).
 Izzy Heminger named CHA Defensive Player of the Week (February 6, 2023).
 Courtney Correia named CHA Forward of the Week (February 20, 2023).
 Tessa Janecke named CHA Rookie of the Week (February 20, 2023).
 Josie Bothun named CHA Goalie of the Week (February 20, 2023).

References 

Vermont Catamounts
Penn State Nittany Lions women's ice hockey
Penn State Nittany Lions women's ice hockey
Penn State women's ice hockey seasons